Presidential elections were held in Serbia on 29 September 2002, with a second round on 13 October. However, the result was invalidated because turnout in the second round was less than 50%. Fresh elections were held in December.

Results

References

2002 09
Serbia
2002 09
Serbia
Serbia
Presidential